Crista Arangala (née Crista Lynn Coles) is an American mathematician and textbook author, specializing in numerical analysis. She is a professor of mathematics and chair of the department of mathematics and statistics at Elon University, and a Fulbright Scholar.

Education
Arangala graduated from Allegheny College in 1993. She earned her Ph.D. in 2000 from the University of Cincinnati, with a dissertation on Numerical Identification of Parameters in Inverse Heat Conduction and Inverse Euler Bernoulli Beam Theory supervised by Diego Antonio Murio.

International work
Arangala has regularly taken her Elon mathematics classes to India and Sri Lanka, where they have participated in elementary-school mathematics education. In 2013–2014 she was a Fulbright Scholar in Sri Lanka.

Books
Arangala's books include:

</ref>

References

Year of birth missing (living people)
Living people
21st-century American mathematicians
American women mathematicians
Allegheny College alumni
University of Cincinnati alumni
Elon University faculty
21st-century American women
Fulbright alumni